Edith Franklin Wyatt (September 14, 1873October 26, 1958) was an American writer.

Edith Franklin Wyatt was born on September 14, 1873, in Tomah, Wisconsin. Her family moved to Chicago when she was young. She attended Miss Rice's Higher School for Girls, in Chicago, and studied at Bryn Mawr College from 1892 to 1894. In Chicago, she taught at Hull House. She died on October 26, 1958, in Chicago.

Works 

 Every One His Own Way (1901)
 True Love (1903)
 Making Both Ends Meet: The Income and Outlay of New York Working Girls (with Sue Ainslie Clark)
 Great Companions (1917)
 
 The Invisible Gods (1923)
 The Satyr's Children: A Fable (1939)

References 

1873 births
1958 deaths
20th-century American women writers
Bryn Mawr College alumni
People from Tomah, Wisconsin
Writers from Chicago